Roberto Sosa may refer to:
Roberto Sosa (poet) (1930–2011), Honduran author and poet
Roberto Sosa (Argentine footballer) (born 1975), Argentine footballer
Roberto Sosa (Uruguayan footballer) (born 1935)
Roberto Sosa (actor)

See also
Sosa (surname)